1946 was the 47th season of County Championship cricket in England. It was the first full season of first-class cricket to be played in England after World War II. It featured a three-match Test series between England and India, which was arranged at short notice. Yorkshire retained the County Championship title, having been the last pre-war champions in 1939. Wisden Cricketers' Almanack (1947 edition), in its review of the 1946 season, remarked that "the weather in 1946 might have been dreadful, but it didn't stop the crowds flocking to games".

Honours
 County Championship – Yorkshire
 Minor Counties Championship – Suffolk
 Wisden – Alec Bedser, Laurie Fishlock, Vinoo Mankad, Peter Smith, Cyril Washbrook

Test series

England managed to arrange a three-match series against India, whose team was captained by former England player Iftikhar Ali Khan, the Nawab of Pataudi and included Vinoo Mankad, Vijay Merchant and future Pakistan captain Abdul Hafeez Kardar. Mankad was named by Wisden as one of its "Five Cricketers of the Year" in the 1947 edition.

England won the First Test thanks to Alec Bedser's 11 wickets on his debut. The Second Test was drawn after India's last two batsmen held out for the final 13 minutes with England well ahead, Bedser again having taken 11 wickets in the match. The Third Test was also drawn after being ruined by persistent rain.
 First Test at Lord's: England won by 10 wickets
 Second Test at Old Trafford: match drawn
 Third Test at The Oval: match drawn

County Championship

Leading batsmen – all first-class matches

Leading bowlers – all first-class matches

References

External links
 CricketArchive – season summary

Bibliography
 Wisden Cricketers' Almanack 1947

1946 in English cricket
English cricket seasons in the 20th century